Francisco Huerta Montalvo (18 June 1940 – 2 July 2022) was an Ecuadorian politician.

Huerta died of cardiac arrest in Guayaquil on 2 July 2022 at the age of 82.

References

1940 births
2022 deaths
Ecuadorian Radical Liberal Party politicians
Ecuadorian Ministers of Health
Interior ministers of Ecuador
Ambassadors of Ecuador to Venezuela
Mayors of Guayaquil
University of Guayaquil alumni